The Road Runners MC is one of Poland's outlaw motorcycle clubs.

Genesis
The beginnings of the Road Runners MC go back to 1978. In the beginning, its name was VC 1978, which by the abbreviation for Veteran Club 1978. The name and today's colors of the club were only adopted a few years later. The name Road Runners descends from a brand of motorcycle tires, preferred by the club members at the time. The back-patch design was chosen with a winged wheel and black and yellow club colors. The Road Runners MC is the oldest Polish-born motorcycle club. Over the years, the club, originally from Silesia, expanded across Poland. In 2005 the founder and president of the club, Miroslaw Miro Stefanczyk, died. He is instrumental in the formation of motorcycle and rocker scene in Poland and was a legend during his lifetime among Polish motorcyclists. His funeral was attended by motorcycle riders from all over the world. The Road Runners MC is one of the founders and board members of Kongres Polskich Klubów Motocyklowych, an umbrella organization of Polish motorcycle clubs.

Support groups
 AdRRenalina MC Poland
 BRRave Knights MC Poland
 DaggeRRs MC Poland
 DaRRksiders MC Poland

Alleged criminal activity

Multiple individual members of Road Runners MC have been suspected at times to be connected with various criminal activities. Several members, among them the club's Board of Directors, were arrested in December 2006 by the Polish Centralne Biuro Śledcze (CBS, the national investigative authority). The indictment was, among other things, on charges of forming a criminal organization. The suspicion was not confirmed, and all but one member — who died while in custody in unexplained circumstances, — were released from remand in 2007. The media reports surrounding the arrest were criticized by Polish director and filmmaker Sylvester Latkowski. Latkowski is planning to create a film about the motorcycle club members he claims to have met in person. In Austria, there was a reaction from the authorities on the establishment of the Vienna Prospect Chapter. A search by the Vienna police of the club's premises in the 16th district of Vienna, as well as the apartments of some members of the club, found numerous firearms, a bat and stabbing weapons. According to the Austrian police there were also found "traces of drugs, particularly amphetamines", which is disputed by the members of the club. The investigation is still ongoing.

Charitable activity

The Road Runners MC was and is the initiator and organizer of several events with a charitable purpose. The biggest annual event of the Road Runners takes place in Skarżysko-Kamienna, a fundraiser and auction specially crafted gold and silver badge meeting to benefit seriously ill children. Smaller fundraisers and auctions are held at other events of the Road Runners. Moreover, the association is co-founder and organizer of a nationwide campaign under the name MotoSerce (freely translated Engine Heart), in each year, all motorcyclists in Poland are called upon to donate to a blood drive. The chapter in Białystok also supports a Polish orphanage in Supraśl . The association has donated bicycles for the children, and provided assistance for the renovation of the home premises.

Groups with the same name

In Germany, Switzerland, Italy and the United States, there are more motorcycle clubs called Road Runners MC, but these are unrelated to the Polish club.

References

External links
 Road Runners MC Poland (Polish)
 Road Runners MC United States (English/Polish)
 Road Runners MC Austria (English)

Outlaw motorcycle clubs
Clubs and societies in Poland